Richburg is a town in Chester County, South Carolina, United States. The population was 275 at the 2010 census, down from 332 at the 2000 census.

History
The Elliott House and Landsford Plantation House are listed on the National Register of Historic Places.

Geography
Richburg is located in east-central Chester County at  (34.717374, -81.019635). Interstate 77 passes just west of the town, with access from Exits 62 and 65. I-77 leads north  to Charlotte and south  to Columbia. South Carolina Highway 9 passes through the northeast side of the town, leading west  to Chester, the county seat, and east  to Lancaster.

Demographics

As of the census of 2000, there were 332 people, 122 households, and 87 families residing in the town. The population density was 400.2 people per square mile (154.4/km2). There were 134 housing units at an average density of 161.5 per square mile (62.3/km2). The racial makeup of the town was 23.49% White, 74.70% African American, 1.20% Asian, and 0.60% from two or more races. Hispanic or Latino of any race were 1.20% of the population.

There were 122 households, out of which 31.1% had children under the age of 18 living with them, 38.5% were married couples living together, 27.0% had a female householder with no husband present, and 27.9% were non-families. 24.6% of all households were made up of individuals, and 15.6% had someone living alone who was 65 years of age or older. The average household size was 2.72 and the average family size was 3.26.

In the town, the population was spread out, with 24.7% under the age of 18, 7.8% from 18 to 24, 21.7% from 25 to 44, 29.5% from 45 to 64, and 16.3% who were 65 years of age or older. The median age was 40 years. For every 100 females, there were 77.5 males. For every 100 females age 18 and over, there were 71.2 males.

The median income for a household in the town was $31,875, and the median income for a family was $40,000. Males had a median income of $35,893 versus $18,295 for females. The per capita income for the town was $13,048. About 9.7% of families and 13.6% of the population were below the poverty line, including 22.5% of those under age 18 and 21.4% of those age 65 or over.

Education
Richburg has a public library, a branch of the Chester County Library System.

Media
WRBK, 90.3 FM, a noncommercial station that primarily features classic oldies

Notable residents
 Buck Baker, NASCAR driver
 Sheldon Brown, professional football player
 Marty Marion, baseball player (birthplace)

References

External links

109 Broad Street - Richburg Post Office

Towns in Chester County, South Carolina
Towns in South Carolina